Apollo and Diana or The Liberal Arts presented to King Charles and Henrietta Maria is a 1628 painting by Gerard van Honthorst, now on the Queen's Staircase at Hampton Court Palace as part of the Royal Collection.

The artist spent the last nine months of 1628 in London working for Charles I of England, having previously been commissioned several times by Charles' sister Elizabeth. The work's original location is unknown, but it may have been a commission from the Duke of Buckingham in an attempt to compete with Rubens' recent Marie de' Medici cycle, whose creation Buckingham had seen in Paris. 

At top left are Charles himself in the guise of Apollo and his wife Henrietta Maria as Apollo's sister Diana, with Buckingham as Mercury in the centre. The work's first mention in the written records places it in storage near Banqueting House.

References

1628 paintings
17th-century allegorical paintings
Allegorical paintings by Dutch artists
Charles I of England in art
Paintings by Gerard van Honthorst
Paintings in the Royal Collection of the United Kingdom
Henrietta Maria
Paintings of Apollo
Paintings depicting Diana (mythology)
Mercury (mythology)